The Women's 1500 metres event  at the 1986 European Athletics Indoor Championships was held on 23 February.

Results

References

1500 metres at the European Athletics Indoor Championships
1500
Euro